Rorik I was a Danish Viking chieftain. Having been expelled from Denmark with his brothers after participating in a long war of succession, Rorik raided Friesland and the areas of the lower Rhine. He was the father of Knut Roriksson, prominent member of the Great Heathen Army. 

9th-century Danish people
Viking warriors
9th-century Vikings